Matthias Ettrich (born 14 June 1972) is a German computer scientist and founder of the KDE and LyX projects.

Early life 
Ettrich was born in Bietigheim-Bissingen, Baden-Württemberg, and went to school in Beilstein while living with his parents in Oberstenfeld. He passed the Abitur in 1991. Ettrich studied for his MSc in Computer Science at the Wilhelm Schickard Institute for Computer Science at the University of Tübingen.

Career 
He currently resides in Berlin, Germany. He is currently focused on advising start-ups and corporations on digital transformation and in sound technical decision making.

Free software projects 
Ettrich founded and furthered the LyX project in 1995, initially conceived as a university term project. LyX is a graphical frontend to LaTeX.

Since LyX's main target platform was Linux, he started to explore different ways to improve the graphical user interface, which ultimately led him to the KDE project. Ettrich founded KDE in 1996, when he proposed on Usenet a "consistent, nice looking free desktop-environment"  for Unix-like systems using Qt as its widget toolkit.

On 6 November 2009, Ettrich was decorated with the Federal Cross of Merit for his contributions to Free Software.

References

External links 

 The People Behind KDE: Interview with Matthias Ettrich (2000)
 The People Behind KDE: Interview with Matthias Ettrich (2004)

1972 births
Computer programmers
Free software programmers
German computer scientists
KDE
Living people
People from Bietigheim-Bissingen
Recipients of the Medal of the Order of Merit of the Federal Republic of Germany